Thomas Bishop (by 1506–1560) was an English politician who was a Member of the Parliament (MP) for Gatton in 1542. He was the father of Sir Thomas Bishopp, 1st Baronet.

References

1560 deaths
English MPs 1542–1544
Year of birth uncertain
People from Henfield